Jamie Parke is an American Magic: the Gathering player. His major successes include four Grand Prix top eights and three Pro Tour top eights.

Achievements

References 

Living people
American Magic: The Gathering players
People from New York City
Year of birth missing (living people)